Billy is a lunar impact crater that is located at the southern fringes of the Oceanus Procellarum, in the western hemisphere of the Moon. It was named after French mathematician Jacques de Billy. It lies to the southeast of the similar-sized crater Hansteen, and west-southwest of the flooded Letronne.

The interior floor of Billy has been flooded by basaltic lava, leaving a dark surface due to the low albedo. The portion of the rim remaining above the surface is narrow and low, with a thin inner wall. Only a few tiny craterlets mark the interior.

To the north of the crater is a triangular mountainous formation named Mons Hansteen, from the nearby crater. Southeast of Billy is a rille, designated Rima Billy, that runs 70 kilometers to the south.

Satellite craters
By convention these features are identified on lunar maps by placing the letter on the side of the crater midpoint that is closest to Billy.

References

External links

Impact craters on the Moon